The 2012 Pac-12 Football Championship Game was played on Friday, November 30, 2012 at Stanford Stadium in Stanford, California to determine the 2012 football champion of the Pac-12 Conference (Pac-12). It was the second football conference championship for the Pac-12 Conference, or any of its predecessors. The game featured the South Division champions, the UCLA Bruins, against the North Division champions, the Stanford Cardinal. The previous week, the two teams had met at UCLA's home stadium at the Rose Bowl, with Stanford winning 35–17 and clinching the Pac-12 North Division championship. Stanford headed back to Pasadena for the January 1, 2013 Rose Bowl Game where they defeated the Wisconsin Badgers 20–14.

This was UCLA's second consecutive appearance and Stanford's first appearance in the Pac-12 Championship Game. In 2011, the Bruins lost the inaugural game at Oregon.

Scoring summary

Statistics

See also
 List of Pac-12 Conference football champions

References

Championship
2012
Stanford Cardinal football games
UCLA Bruins football games
Sports in Stanford, California
Pac-12 Football Championship Game
Pac-12 Football Championship Game